Ashour Suleiman Shuwail (born 1954) is a retired Libyan security officer who served as the minister of interior in the cabinet that was formed after the first democratic elections in July 2012.

Early life and education
Shuwail's family is from Benghazi. He was born in Benghazi in 1954.

He received a master's degree in law from Benghazi University in 1995 and a PhD in law from Ain Shams University in Egypt in 2000.

Career
Shuwail worked in the Libyan police forces. In October 2012, Shuwail was nominated for minister of interior by prime minister Ali Zeidan. However, the High Commission for the Application of Standards of Integrity and Patriotism that evaluated the suitability of nominees declared that four nominees, including Shuwail, did not endorsed him as interior minister. However, at the beginning of December 2012, he won the case against the verdict of the commission and was officially appointed as minister.

On 21 May 2013, Shuwail resigned from office for "personal reasons". Mohammed Khalifa Al Sheikh replaced him in the post on 26 May 2013 after the Libyan congress approved him.

References

1954 births
Ain Shams University alumni
Interior ministers of Libya
Libyan politicians
Living people
People from Benghazi
University of Benghazi alumni